Club d'Esports Vendrell, also known as Moritz Vendrell for sponsorship reasons, is a Spanish sports club based in El Vendrell, in the autonomous community of Catalonia. Founded in 1913, the club is commonly known by its roller hockey section, that currently plays in the OK Liga.

History

Founded in 1913, Vendrell incorporated a rink hockey section in 1958. In 1976 it promoted for the first time to the first division.

In 2010, the club started its golden years by promoting again to OK Liga. Three years later, Vendrell won its first title ever by winning the Copa del Rey. In that 2013, it also conquered its first continental title by achieving the CERS Cup.

In 2014, the club made its debut in the top continental tournament, the CERH European League and also re-conquered the Spanish cup. In the next season, Vendrell participated in the Final Four of the European League.

Season to season

Trophies
Copa del Rey: 2
2013, 2014
CERS Cup: 1
2013

References

External links
 Official website

Catalan rink hockey clubs
Sports clubs established in 1913
1913 establishments in Spain